Jui Khurd is a village in the Bhiwani district of the Indian state of Haryana. , the village had 1,303 households with a total population of 6,821 of which 3,631 were male and 3,208 female.
Ex chief minister Ch. Bansi Lal got his primary education here. BCCCI president Ranbir Singh Mahindra also got study in Jui.

References

Villages in Bhiwani district